Dr. Edwin Lawrence Barnhart (born October 29, 1968) is an American archaeologist and explorer specializing in ancient civilizations of the Americas. He is the founder and Director of the Maya Exploration Center, President of Ancient Explorations and fellow of The Explorers Club.

Barnhart's early career focused on survey and mapping in Mesoamerica. He re-discovered the city of Ma’ax Na ("Spider-Monkey House"), in Belize in 1995. He also led the Palenque Mapping Project in 1998–2000, at the invitation of the Mexican government, which documented 1478 structures in the Maya ruins of Palenque, in Chiapas, Mexico.

Barnhart studied under Linda Schele at the University of Texas at Austin, where he received his Ph.D. in anthropology in 2001. He has an undergraduate degree from the University of Colorado in 1992 with a double major in Anthropology and Latin American Studies.

Barnhart is a public speaker on archaeology topics. He has appeared on the History Channel, Discovery Channel and Japanese public television. He also produced four lecture series for the Teaching Company's Great Courses and has a podcast called ArchaeoEd.

References

External links
 Maya Exploration Center

1968 births
Mayanists
People from Englewood, New Jersey
Scientists from New Jersey
20th-century Mesoamericanists
20th-century American archaeologists
Living people
Historians from New Jersey